The Nakajima G10N Fugaku (Japanese: 富岳 or 富嶽, "Mount Fuji") was a planned Japanese ultra-long-range heavy bomber designed during World War II. It was conceived as a method for mounting aerial attacks from Japan against industrial targets along the west coast (e.g., San Francisco) and in the Midwest (e.g., Detroit, Chicago, and Wichita) and the northeast (e.g., New York City and Norfolk) of the United States. Japan's worsening war situation resulted in the project's cancellation in 1944 and no prototype was ever built.

Design and development

The Fugaku had its origins in "Project Z (bomber project)", a 1942 Imperial Japanese Army specification for an intercontinental bomber which could take off from the Kuril Islands, bomb the continental United States, then continue onward to land in German-occupied France. Once there, it would be refueled and rearmed and make another return sortie.

Project Z called for three variations on the airframe: heavy bomber, transport (capable of carrying 300 troops), and a gunship armed with forty downward-firing machine guns in the fuselage for intense ground attacks at the rate of 640 rounds per second (i.e. 38,400 rounds per minute).

The project was conceived by Nakajima Aircraft Company head Chikuhei Nakajima.  The design had straight wings and contra-rotating four-blade propellers.  To save weight, some of the landing gear was to be jettisoned after takeoff (being unnecessary on landing with emptied bomb load), as had been planned on some of the more developed German Amerika Bomber competing designs.  It used six engines, as with the later Amerikabomber design competitors, to compensate for nearly all German aircraft engines being limited to 1,500 kW (2,000 hp) maximum output levels apiece.

Development was initiated in January 1943 and a design and manufacturing facility built in Mitaka, Tokyo.  Nakajima's 4-row 36-cylinder 5,000 hp Ha-54 (Ha-505) engine was abandoned as too complex.

Project Z was cancelled in July 1944, and the Fugaku was never built.

Operators (planned)

Imperial Japanese Navy Air Service – (G10N / Fugaku)
Imperial Japanese Army Air Force – (Project Z)

Specifications (Project Z / Fugaku projected)

See also

References

Notes

Bibliography

 
 
 
 Idei, Tadaaki. Hikōki Mechanism Zukan. Tokyo: Guranpuri Shuppan, 1985.
 Ogawa, Toshihiko. Nihon Kōkūki Daizukan, 1910–1945. Tokyo: Kokushokankōkai, 1993.

External links

 The Nakajima G10N1 Fugaku
 Nakajima G10N "Fugaku" (in Polish)

G10N, Nakajima
G10N, Nakajima
Abandoned military aircraft projects of Japan
G10N